Sidi Saleh (born April 5, 1979) is an Indonesian film director, who was also a film producer of Blind Pig Who Wants To Fly, a film that had been presented in Rotterdam Film Festival, Busan, Tokyo and also in several other film festival selections. He was also a cinematographer of Postcard From The Zoo, (Indonesian First Feature Film Competing at The Berlinale Film Festival), cinematographer of D’bijis, Kara Anak Sebatang Pohon (CannesDirector's Forthnight), Yokudo/Taksu (Japan), This Longing (Malaysia).

Biography
Sidi Saleh first entered the film industry in the early 2000s, not long after graduating from Jakarta Institute of Arts, to pursue a career path as a cinematographer, the path he chose since he is already accustomed to working with a camera (his father used to work in the field of wedding video documentation).

Early career

Cinematographer

In his early days as a cinematographer, Sidi got involved in several film productions, Kara, Anak Sebatang Pohon, Blind Pig Who Wants To Fly (also worked as the film producer), and Kebun Binatang (International title: Postcards from the Zoo). Kara, Anak Sebatang Pohon won an award as The Best Short Film in the 2005 Indonesian Film Festival. Furthermore, it also became the only Indonesian film passed the Director's Fortnight (Quinzaine des Réalisateurs) selection at Cannes Film Festival in the same year. In addition to the above achievement,  Blind Pig who Wants to Fly also won a prestigious award from FIPRESCI at the International Film Festival Rotterdam in 2009 while Postcard From The Zoo competed in the main competition at Berlinale Film Festival in 2012.

Film director

Sidi's directorial debut began in 2011 with Full Moon, one of the segments in the film titled Belkibolang. Other films he directed, Fitri, included in the International Short Film Festival Clermont-Ferrand in 2014. His hard toil wasn't for nothing as Maryam, a carefully crafted story of a Muslim stuck in the ritual of another religion with someone who has autism while she is experiencing a difficult inner pressure herself, won Orizzonti Award for Best Short Film in The Venice Film Festival or Venice International Film Festival (Mostra Internazionale d'Arte Cinematografica della Biennale Venezia, "International Exhibition of Cinematographic Art of the Venice Biennale"), founded in 1932 by Giuseppe Volpi. This is the oldest film festival in the world and one of the "Big Three" film festivals alongside the Cannes Film Festival and Berlin International Film Festival and he became the first Indonesian film maker ever winning an award from one of the prestigious and the oldest film festivals in Europe.

Awards and honors

References

External links
 

1979 births
Living people
Indonesian film directors
Indonesian cinematographers
Indonesian film producers
People from Jakarta